Max is an extinct town in Dent County, in the U.S. state of Missouri. The GNIS classifies it as a populated place.

A post office called Max was established in 1912, and remained in operation until 1954. An early postmaster gave the community the first name of his son, Max Coffman.

References

Ghost towns in Missouri
Former populated places in Dent County, Missouri